Nadine Elizabeth Louise Coyle (born 15 June 1985) is an Irish singer, songwriter, actress and model. In 2002, Coyle was selected as a member of the girl group Girls Aloud, with whom she has been successful in achieving a string of 20 consecutive UK top ten singles (including four number ones), two UK number one albums, five consecutive platinum selling studio albums and received nominations for five BRIT Awards, winning Best Single in 2009 for "The Promise".

Coyle released her debut solo album Insatiable and its title track was released on 8 November 2010 through her own label, Black Pen Records, in partnership with supermarket giant Tesco.  In late 2017, she released her new single "Go to Work" on Virgin EMI Records. The single charted at number 57 on the Official Singles Sales Chart, and at number 52 on the Scottish Singles Chart. Coyle released her Nadine EP the same year, reaching number 1 on iTunes chart. In 2019, her single "Fool for Love" was released under Xenomania. In 2020, her single "All That I Know" was released, which peaked at number 62 on the Scottish Singles Chart.

Early life
Coyle was born on 15 June 1985 to Lillian and Niall Coyle in Derry, Northern Ireland. Her parents first noticed her talent for singing at the age of two, when she sang The Drifters' "Saturday Night at the Movies". Coyle was uninterested in her education but received good marks. She recorded a demo CD, which was distributed to Louis Walsh and The Late Late Show. The CD included cover versions of "Fields of Gold", "Somewhere Over the Rainbow", "Love Is", and the aria "Summertime".

Career

2001: Popstars
While attending Thornhill College in 2001, Coyle auditioned for the Irish version of the reality television talent show Popstars, on which Louis Walsh was a judge. She won a place in the band Six, but it was later revealed that she had lied about her age. She was 16 years old, two years younger than the minimum age requirement of 18. Coyle said she was "exploited" by RTÉ. She returned to Thornhill College in Derry.

2002–2009: Girls Aloud

Walsh encouraged Coyle to enter Popstars: The Rivals, the second British series of the international Popstars franchise. The series' goal was to create two winning pop groups – a boy band and a girl group, each consisting of five members who would then partake in "a battle of the sexes" as they vie for the Christmas number one on the UK Singles Chart. Several thousand applicants attended auditions across the UK in hope of being selected. Ten girls and ten boys were chosen as finalists by judges Walsh, Pete Waterman, and Geri Halliwell. These finalists then took to the stage participating in weekly Saturday night live performances (alternating weekly between the girls and boys). Following her performance of "Fields of Gold", Walsh told her she gave the "performance of the night. Stole the show for me," while fellow judge Halliwell said, "I'd love to buy a single of yours already".

Coyle joined Cheryl Tweedy, Sarah Harding, Nicola Roberts, and Kimberley Walsh to comprise the new girl group Girls Aloud, formed through the show by a public vote on 30 November 2002. The group's debut single "Sound of the Underground" peaked at number one on the UK Singles Chart, becoming the 2002 Christmas number one. Girls Aloud hold the record for the shortest time between formation and reaching number one. The group released their debut album Sound of the Underground in May 2003, which entered the charts at number two and was certified platinum by the British Phonographic Industry (BPI) later the same year. Their singles "I'll Stand by You", "Walk This Way", and "The Promise" have charted at number one. Two of their albums have reached the top of the UK Albums Chart: their greatest hits album The Sound of Girls Aloud and 2008's Out of Control, both of which entered the chart at number one, with over one million copies of the former being sold.
They also achieved seven certified albums and have been nominated for five Brit Awards, winning the 2009 Best Single for "The Promise".

The group's musical style is pop, but throughout their career they had experimented with electropop and dance-pop. Girls Aloud's collaborations with Brian Higgins and his songwriting and production team Xenomania earned the group critical acclaim, due to an innovative approach to mainstream pop music. The group became one of the few UK reality television acts to achieve continued success, amassing a fortune of £30 million by May 2010. Guinness World Records lists them as "Most Successful Reality TV Group" in the 2007 edition. They also hold the record for "Most Consecutive Top Ten Entries in the UK by a Female Group" in the 2008 edition, and are credited again for "Most Successful Reality TV Group" in the 2011 edition. The group was also named the United Kingdom's biggest selling girl group of the 21st century, with over 4.3 million singles sales and 4 million albums sold in the UK alone.

2009–2013: Insatiable and Girls Aloud reunion

In 2009, Girls Aloud decided they would partake in a hiatus to pursue solo projects. That same year, Coyle collaborated with Boyz II Men for their album Love, recording a cover of the Take That song "Back for Good", although the song was cut from the final track listing. Coyle also worked with Jay Sean, although the duet was later scrapped.

Coyle announced plans to release a solo album during Girls Aloud's hiatus. She enlisted Barbara Charone, who has worked with Madonna and Christina Aguilera, as a publicist and Bruce Garfield as her manager. Early reports indicated three major record labels interested in Coyle, In April 2010, it was reported she had signed to Geffen Records. The deal later fell through. In August 2010, Coyle officially signed a deal with grocery store chain Tesco's new record label, releasing the album through her own Black Pen Records imprint.

She worked with a number of famous songwriters and producers during recording sessions, such as Desmond Child, Guy Chambers, Mike Elizondo, Steve Booker, Toby Gad, Tony Kanal and newcomer Ricci Riccardi. According to an interview with Booker, Coyle had worked on song ideas using GarageBand which she then presented to Booker in England to work on together further. The producer said, "She was singing her songs to loops, and then I took the loops out and rewrote the music from scratch to her ideas." He described her songs as "very pop". Booker also worked on songs to show off Coyle's vocals: "Because she’s got such a belting voice, I tried a couple of things where she could really belt," he said.

The album was preceded by the release of her debut single, the title track "Insatiable". Co-written with Guy Chambers and produced by Ricci Riccardi, the song has an "80s feel" and "a harder, guitar-led sound." The single peaked at number twenty-six in the UK Singles Chart.

In November 2012, Coyle reunited with the rest of Girls Aloud to celebrate their tenth anniversary. On 18 November 2012, the band released their new single "Something New" which was also the official charity single for Children in Need. The group released their second greatest hits compilation Ten on 26 November 2012. Coyle and the group embarked on the Ten: The Hits Tour in February. After the tour's conclusion in March 2013, the group announced that they were disbanding.

2015–present: Nadine and new projects
In late June, Coyle appeared on ITV's Michael Flatley: A Night to Remember, as part of ITV Music Specials. On the programme she sang a cover of "Dangerous Games", shortly thereafter she announced she would star alongside Flatley on his 2014 tour on select dates. Coyle, in August, also revealed she has been in the studio recording new songs for a forthcoming second studio album.

On 16 September 2014, Coyle announced that she began working with longtime collaborator Brian Higgins. In March 2015, Coyle spoke about the details concerning her second album, stating that she intended on signing with a major label and that the sound is "similar" to that of London Grammar. Later that year, Nadine recorded a duet with Shane Filan from the band Westlife for his album Right Here. They performed the single, titled "I Could Be" together on that year's annual Children in Need telethon.

In July 2017, it was announced that Coyle had signed a recording deal with Virgin EMI Records. She released her new single, "Go to Work", on 8 September 2017. In February 2018, it was announced that Coyle will release a four-track EP Nadine in April 2018. "Girls on Fire" was the first track to be released from the EP, on 8 February 2018.

Coyle announced a seven-date tour, touring the UK and Ireland in May 2018. The tour was cancelled without reschedule in April 2018, a month before commencing, with Coyle stating it was becoming "impossible to achieve" what they had wanted to do, and that the cancellation was "definitely a lesson" for her. In 2019, Coyle returned to the music scene with her summer anthem "Fool for Love", produced by Brian Higgins of Xenomania. In December of that year, Coyle announced another track called "All That I Know" which was released in 2020.

In October 2022, Nadine sang a cover of The Cranberries classic Zombie, as it was voted the number 1 Irish song of all time by RTE2FM listeners. Her performance gathered great reviews.

Other ventures
As a member of Girls Aloud, Coyle has also appeared in the fly on the wall documentary Girls Aloud: Home Truths, the E4 documentary series Girls Aloud: Off the Record, and a one-off variety show entitled The Girls Aloud Party. Coyle made a cameo appearance in Natasha Bedingfield's video for "I Wanna Have Your Babies".

Coyle contributed to the book Dreams that Glitter - Our Story, an autobiography with her Girls Aloud bandmates, in October 2008. The book was written with a ghostwriter and published by the Transworld imprint Bantam Press. The book featured unseen photographs and included insights into the members' personal lives, their success together, style tips, and "everything we've learned about life, love and music."

As a member of Girls Aloud, Coyle has also endorsed Barbie, KitKat, Nintendo DS, Samsung, Sunsilk and Pandora.

In December 2009, Coyle visited her hometown of Derry to successfully break the record of the most trees planted in one site in an hour by 100 volunteers. Coyle has also dedicated some of her time to charities, including the Northern Ireland children's hospice.

Coyle published her new record label Black Pen Records, which additionally released her debut album Insatiable and her further singles. In 2012, Coyle served as a guest judge for an episode of the series America's Next Top Model.

In March 2018, Coyle appeared in Fabulous Magazine with a cover photo shoot and feature interview where she discussed life after Girls Aloud.

In 2019, Coyle participated in the nineteenth series of I'm a Celebrity...Get Me Out of Here! and finished in fifth place.

Personal life
Coyle had a cancer scare when she found a lump in her breast when she was 17.

In 2006, Coyle moved from Northern Ireland to Los Angeles, California. This led to her constantly commuting back and forth between the US and the UK for her projects with Girls Aloud and as a solo artist. Whilst living in Los Angeles, Coyle opened an Irish pub restaurant in Sunset Beach, California named Nadine's Irish Mist in 2008 as a family business, which would allow family members to live near her and help her run the business. In 2013, her estimated wealth was £6 million according to that year's Sunday Times Rich List.

On 15 August 2013, Coyle announced on her Instagram account that she was expecting a child. She further confirmed her reunion with ex-fiancé Jason Bell, who is the father of her daughter. Their daughter, Anaíya Bell, was born on 10 February 2014.

In 2015, after nine years in Los Angeles, Coyle closed down Nadine's Irish Mist and moved back to Northern Ireland to raise her daughter Anaíya. She stated that she decided to close the restaurant as the business gradually took a toll on her overworked family members, and that she was tired of being approached by film and television producers who wanted to use the restaurant for their projects. She also stated that she was becoming homesick for Northern Ireland whilst living in Los Angeles.

Coyle and Bell split in 2019 "due to their increasingly distanced lives", as Bell remained in the United States when Coyle returned to Northern Ireland. However, by 2021 the two were living together in Northern Ireland to allow Bell to co-parent Anaíya during the COVID-19 pandemic.

Discography

Studio albums

Extended plays

Singles

Lead

Note

Collaborations

Filmography

See also
 List of I'm a Celebrity...Get Me Out of Here! (British TV series) contestants

References

External links
 

1985 births
Living people
I'm a Celebrity...Get Me Out of Here! (British TV series) participants
Girls Aloud members
Participants in Irish reality television series
People educated at Thornhill College
Actors from Derry (city)
Popstars winners
Women singers from Northern Ireland
Pop singers from Northern Ireland
Rhythm and blues singers
Musicians from Derry (city)
Models from Derry (city)